Scrupariina is a suborder under order Cheilostomatida. The structure of the individual zooids is generally simple, with an uncalcified, flexible frontal wall. The obsolete sub-order Anasca previously included the members of this sub-order before being deprecated.

References 

Protostome suborders
Cheilostomatida